Sok Kong (born in Prey Veng Province, Cambodia) is a Khmer businessman and founder of Sokimex, a company based in Cambodia. He is considered among Cambodia's two "most successful entrepreneurs" along with Kith Meng.

Biography

From defending Prey Veng to fleeing the Khmer Rouges 
Kong was born to a Khmer family, whose parents are Vietnamese,  in Prey Veng Province, Cambodia in 1948. His education did not go beyond the third grade. In 1975, Sok Kong who had joined the Khmer National Armed Forces was interviewed by the New York Times in the turmoil of the Cambodian Civil War, hitching a ride back to Phnom Penh from his post 20 miles to the northwest, telling the reporter: "[The Americans] give all the equipment we need. But we don't get it. The big people take it all."

In 1975, he fled from the Khmer Rouge to Vietnam, working on a farm in Đồng Tháp province  and came back a few years later.

Returning to Cambodia as a Serial Entrepreneur 
Sok Kong started his career in the 1980s with an initial capital of $100usd, started supplying fuel to Cambodia, he expanded later on to include a small scale rubber processing and manufacturing business producing motorbikes and plastic tires. He created his own rubber mill and signed a deal with the government to manufacture sandals from old tires. From this, he expanded his venture in the petroleum sector to be a dominant player by the early 90’s. Later on, his expansion included supplying the Khmer government with military uniforms, food, aluminium, and medicine imported from Vietnam, through the good ties that he kept with other entrepreneur associates he met while living for a short while in Vietnam during the late 70’s.

Rebuilding peace and the economy after the restoration of Khmer monarchy 
In 1988-1989 when the Vietnamese army withdrew to the country, the Cambodian army continued to sign a contract with Sok Kong to supply cloth, cammen, and pots for the army.

By 1990, his capital grew up to $100,000. His company started selling gasoline to the government and to UNTAC in 1992. In 1994, he opened a garment factory. In 1996, the Cambodian government sold its gasoline storage stations, and Sok Kong acquired them.

In 1996, Sokimex purchased the state oil company Compagnie Kampuchea des Carburants for $10.6 million and took over its fuel storage in Phnom Penh and Sihanoukville, allowing him to control the main port is Sihanoukville , on the Gulf of Thailand , which has 11 berths and can accommodate vessels of 10,000—15,000 tons.

Fueling the 1997 coup in favor of Hun Sen 

Kong won Hun Sen's gratitude during the 1997 Cambodian coup d'état, when the Sokimex provided the Cambodian People's Party with gasoline. Stripping Khmer-Chinese businessman Duong Chhiv from the contract he had obtained in 1996, Sok Kong obtained the monopoly on the supply of medicines to the Ministry of Health in reward, decreasing the price paid by the Ministry by 14 per cent from 1998 to 1999.

In 1999, Sok Kong acquired the ticketing rights to Angkor Wat, which it operates in "admirantly efficient" way in exchange for a flat fee of $1 million each year.

Growing a diversified but criticized business 
Sok Kong continued to develop Sokimex with his brother Sok Vanna, and in close relation with the Cambodian government. In 2000, opposition leader Sam Rainsy accused Sokimex of being set up with the support of the Vietnamese invading army and that it became the financial pillar for the ruling CPP, thus enjoying unfair advantages over its competition.

Until October 2007, Sok Kong and Teng Bunma controlled the Cambodian Chamber of Commerce, which he headed from 2002 to 2005, until they chose Kith Meng, with no dissenting votes, as their direct successor.

By 2008, Sok Kong had diversified into the tourism industry, garment factories, housing developments and even a helicopter company, but he decided to shift his investment priority to tourism and hotels.

In 2008, Sok Kong was confirmed as the new owner of the lion's share of Occheuteal Beach, the largest and most popular public dune in the region of Sihanoukville.

Leaving a legacy on Bokor Mountain 
On 25 January 2022, Sok Kong announced to build a road connecting National Road 4 to Bokor Mountain with a length of about 27 kilometers. He also announced his intention to sell Sokha Hotel Phnom Penh and surrounding areas in Chroy Changvar for $1.5 billion and allocate that money to further develop Bokor’s Thansur Sokha Hotel and pay off debts.

Legacy

Business practises 
Sok Kong has been widely criticized for his business practises since the 1980's, though he questions his critics, wondering if anyone would have taken the risk that he dared to take at that time. Since then, Sok Kong has promoted better business practises: since becoming President of the Phnom Penh Chamber of Commerce for example, he signed the statement on corporate governance by the Confederation of Asia-Pacific Chambers of Commerce and Industry.

He has criticized the impunity of certain oknha and has called for equal treatment before justice:

Angkor controversy 
The main opposition political party at the time led by Kem Sokha, and Sam Rainsy, co-leaders of the now legally dissolved opposition Cambodian National Rescue Party, wanting to create strife and controversy, started rumors by baselessly accusing the Apsara Authority the body that overseas the Angkor Archaeological Park, of underreporting revenue in order to benefit Sok Kong. In March 2012, an anonymous group filed a corruption complaint with the country’s Anti-Corruption Unit, accusing Sokimex of siphoning off most of the ticket revenue and calling the contract between the government and the company “irregular,” but Bun Narith, Apsara Authority’s general director, dismissed the allegations as baseless.  In May 2017, senior opposition lawmaker Son Chhay called once again for a review of government spending on the Apsara Authority, in link with its dealings with Sok Kong.

However, Sok Kong has invested countless millions in order to develop the attractivity of Siem Reap to foreign tourists. His activities included many charitable contributions to the area. He built public restrooms, repaired roads, and developing anything from luxury hotels to a hot air balloon.

Environmental issues 
While many environmentalists have voiced criticism against developments promoted by Sok Kong, the latter as stated his commitment to protecting the natural beauty and envioment of Cambodia and asserts that "the real challenge is the environment”, further saying that:

Family 
Sok Kong is married and is the father six children, three boys and three girls.

References

Living people
People from Prey Veng province
Cambodian businesspeople
1948 births